Odessa is a census-designated place (CDP) in Odessa Township, Buffalo County, Nebraska, United States. It is part of the Kearney, Nebraska Micropolitan Statistical Area. The population of the CDP was 130 at the 2010 census.

It was named after Odessa, in Ukraine.

Geography
Interstate 80 passes to the south of Odessa, with access via Exit 263 (Highway 10B/Odessa Road).

Demographics

References

Census-designated places in Buffalo County, Nebraska
Unincorporated communities in Nebraska
Kearney Micropolitan Statistical Area